Pera is the surname of:

 Albano Pera (born 1950), Italian sports shooter
 Alfredo Le Pera (1900–1935), Argentinean journalist, lyricist to Carlos Gardel
 Bernarda Pera (born 1994), Croatian-American tennis player
 Edgar Pêra (born 1960), Portuguese cinematographer
 Joe Pera, American comedian, writer and actor
 Marcello Pera (born 1943), Italian philosopher and politician
 Marcus Junius Pera (230-216 BC), Roman politician
 Marília Pêra (born 1943), Brazilian actress
 Patrick Péra (born 1949), French figure skater
 Radames Pera (born 1960), American actor
 Robert Pera (born 1978), American entrepreneur, owner of Memphis Grizzlies
 Sam Pera, Jr. (born 1989), Cook Islands weightlifter

Italian-language surnames
Croatian surnames